Classic Doctors, New Monsters is an audio play series from Big Finish Productions based on the television series Doctor Who. The stories feature incarnations of the Doctor from the classic era, facing enemies introduced in the revived series (2005 onward).

Cast

Notable guests

 Nicholas Briggs as Captain Kybo
 Giles Watling as Sycorax Chief
 Dan Starkey as Sontaran
 Adjoa Andoh as Racnoss Empress
 Jacqueline Pearce as Cardinal Ollistra

Episodes

Volume 1 (2016)

Volume 2 (2017)

Volume 3: The Stuff of Nightmares (2022)

Volume 4: Broken Memories

References

Audio plays based on Doctor Who
Big Finish Productions
Doctor Who spin-offs